The House of Monok, alternatively spelled Monaky, Monoky, or Monoki in English and Hungarian, is a Hungarian noble dynasty which held power from the 13th century until the 17th century. The earliest ancestors of the House of Monok are of the Clan of Bogát, founded in the late 9th century. The Bogátradvány genus are the predecessors of the Monoky along with other Hungarian noble families, including the House of Rákóczi.

The Monok dynasty took on the name of the village which they came into possession of by royal donation after military service to the royal government of Hungary. Later, a castle would be built in the village of Monok which would be named after the family, colloquially referred to as the Monoky Castle or Monaky Castle. The Monoky family castle was originally constructed around 14th century, but the castle was besieged and burned by the Turks in 1567. After the burning of the castle, it was rebuilt during the 1570s on top of the hill in the center of Monok.

Name 
The origins of the village name "Monok" are uncertain. Allegedly, the name of the village is derived from Slavic monoh meaning monk.

The name of the family originates from the family taking on the name of the village, the first documented person with such a name was Elijah Monoky who lived during the 13th century.

The House of Monok is documented as being originally derived from the Bogát-Radvány (genus) with land being given to the family, namely the village of Monok, for military service. The family, then adopted the name of the village of which they had ownership of leading the family to become known and documented as the Monoks.

History

Origins and early history 
Lászlo Makkai, a Hungarian historian, through his work, Transylvania in the Medieval Hungarian Kingdom (896-1526), mentions the tribes regarding Bogát (Bugat rex) as a Gyula of the Magyar tribal confederation. Additionally, the writings of Simon of Kéza, on the pre-history of the Monoks, include the Bogát-Radván Clan, confirming the Bohemian and Transylvanian origins for many prominent Hungarian noble families including those of the Monok family as being derived from the Magyar tribe of Keszi. Based upon the language used in the texts of Simon of Kéza, the origins of the Bogátradvány Clan are during Migration Period, the Bogátradvány Clan of the tribe of Keszi settled in the East during their conquests in Europe. The family of Bogát, therefore, has its origins somewhere in the 300s Eastern Europe within the ruling family of the tribe of Keszi, one of the seven Magyar tribes.

Simon of Kéza, a Hungarian chroniclor of the 13th century, wrote that the founder of the Monoky was one of the nobles of Árpád, however, a theory exists which states that the Monoky dynasty's founders were refugees from Moravia and Tálya who arrived under Prince Monok after the Tatar invasion. The village of Monok's website states includes the Tatar Theory but ultimately concludes that the Bogát and Radvány families "moved from Lúc to Monok and founded the prestigious Zemplén family, which survived for several centuries under the name Monaky."

The Monok family's earliest documented progenitor is in 921 with the Gyula of the Hungarian tribal federation, Bogát, a Hungarian General and ruling Prince who was then hired by King Berengar of Italy to assist in his war against the rebellious barons of Berengar. Bogát initiated an alliance with King Berengar sometime after 904 but prior to 918. With Bogát came Tarkacsu, also known as Dursan by the Italians, and, together, they crushed the rebellious barons of the Italian realm, namely, Adelbert and Gislebert, and upon returning home, Bogát was awarded a tract of land (which would one day become Monok) in North-Eastern of Hungary for his bravery, thus becoming the progenitor of the Monoks.

It is known that the Monokian branch and the Rákóczian branch of the wider Bogát-Radvánian dynasty were in possession of lands in Bohemia prior to their arrival in Hungary, which were given royal donation. In their early history, the Monok dynasty motto "With Loyalty and Valor" came about from a jousting tournament held after the coronation of King Stephen I of Hungary, this motto would be associated with the family and their cadet branches thereafter.

Lords in Monok 
The progenitor of the Monok dynasty was Illés whose son would come into possession of Monok and be the first documented of the Monoks. The person of Illés is typically listed in documentation under the name of either Alexander or Elijah. The names of the descendants on all genealogical trees, however, perfectly match the descendants of the individual as well as significant dates in the family, which means that both are the same person yet identified differently. During the Tatar invasion, Elijah Monoky held ownership and Lordship over Monok, both the village and family of Monok were not struck nor pillaged by Mongol forces during this conflict. Count Ladislaus, the son of Elijah, would go on to be the first member of the Monok dynasty to extensively use the name "Monok" in records. Lord Elijah Monoky is mentioned in Hungarian records as being born between 1217 and 1277. Among the sons of Ladislaus (d. 1310 and 1333), Michael I was the Viscount of Sáros, while Simon was the Royal Altar Master. Sandrin, son of Michael I, was a master carpenter. Among Sandrin's sons, Stephen was a guard cannoneer in Fehérvár, and Peter was a prominent Catholic clergyman of Szabolcs. The successor of Ladislaus I was his son, Simon Monoky, held Lordship over the Monok lands, which he led for a great part of the mid 14th century. During his tenure as Lord, Simon would obtain ownership of Bekecs and ownership of Szada prior to his death in 1369. 

John II, son of Simon Monoky, became the new Lord of Monok after the death of his father, later being granted the title Lordship of Megyaszó until his death in 1400. The Monoky were loyal to and sometimes active fought for Hungary throughout various conflicts including, but not limited to, the Crusades, the Neapolitan Campaign, the Battle of Szendő, the Battle of Sibiu, the Havasalföld Campaign, the Battle of Rigómez, and the campaigns of King Matthias. During the 14th century, under rule of one of the first Lords over Monok, a castle was erected in the center of the village of Monok which would become known as "Monoky Castle." Michael Monoky de Monok I, son of John II, then took the possessions of his father for a large portion of the 1400s, becoming the Lord of Monok upon the death of his father.

Michael II's son, Nicholas I, would inherit Monok when his father died, and Nicholas I's son, Michael Monoky de Monok III, reigned in the latter half of the 1400s. Mihály Monoky de Monok II held power until his death in the early 1500s, and during his tenure became a Baron of Lúcz, due to the Monoks' blood relation to the House of Lúcz. However, the Barony of Lúcz would later be lost near permanently after the death of the Monok main line in the 17th century. It is from Mihály Monoky de Monok II that the first coat of arms of the Monok dynasty is documented.

Francis Monoky de Monok (Francis I), son of Michael III, would inherit the lands of his predecessor and die with them 1549. Francis I would become next Lord, after the passing of his father. During the reign of Francis I, the Tripartitum was published, the document affirmed the noble status and privileges of the Monoks through the Tripartitum's assertion of equality of nobility and defending nobility from the authority of the crown.

Extinction of the Monoky main line 
The House of Monok and their descendants were raised to hereditary nobility at the rank of Baron, from King Ferdinand II of Hungary on August 16th, 1625 as a result of the service of Nicholas II, 1st Baron of Monok, (d. 1643), a Captain of Ónod, to the Kingdom of Hungary. However, the main male line, consisting of the descendants of John III would die out in 1643, Baron Nicholas III would have prospered. Nicholas Monoky de Monok II and his two brothers would have no male heir, thus leading to the Andrássy family obtaining the Barony of Monok through marriage.

John Monoky de Monok III would become the next Baron, it is noted that he rebuilt the castle of Monok. Another achievement of John III was that of becoming the Captain of the castle of Fülek during military service. Nicholas II, son of John III, then adopted the title of Baron of Monok, later achieving Baronship through his connections and alignment with King Ferdinand II of Hungary, consisting of service in the military and holding an administrative position. In 1625, when Miklos II received the title of Baron with a red seal from King Ferdinand, the title was hereditary and thus went to himself and his family, allowing for other family members to inherit the title.

The Barony of Monok was continuously occupied by the Monoky and, later, the Monoky de Monok until the extinction of the Monoky de Monok male line in 1644 and the inheritance of the barony by the Andrássy noble dynasty through the marriage of Anna Monoky de Monok to Mátyás Andrássy de Csíkszentkirály et Krasznahorkaits. The marriage between Anna Monoky de Monok and Mátyás Andrássy de Csíkszentkirály et Krasznahorkaits would initiate the eventual partitioning of the Monoky de Monok family's lands. Around 1670, Monok Castle was expanded and significantly rebuilt with Thököly describing the converted building in 1673. The description states that the castle was expanded with a two-story block, and the ground floor was given a newer, higher vault.

Thus, the main line of the Monoks collapsed at the peak of their territorial extent, though other lines of continued as remnants of the once powerful Monok dynasty.

Consolidation and Continuation 

The Monok dynasty with its branches of Mónok, Monoky (the Thomist line of Monoks), Mónek (the Franciscan line of Monoks), and Dobi (the Petrine line of Monoks) still existing and continuing on, despite the decline of the Monoky de Monok mainline. Though, a few branches of the family had the name Monoky, however, their children would bear the name Monok due to slowly being distanced from nobility with the loss of their primary titles and estates, such as the village which bore the family's namesake. Due to Nicholas II and his brothers only having daughters, the main line fell apart, though cadet branches such as the Doby (also written as "Dobi") would still prosper.

Péter Monoky de Monok’s son, Miklós Monoky de Monok, was the of the same generation of the famous Baron Miklós Monoky de Monok. Francis Mónoki would have to contend with the continuation of these issues in his own life. Among what is known of Francis II is his coat of arms which was documented in 1694, 1703, and 1707. Stephen Mónok would be documented as having died in Csatár, in the County of Zala, denoting the emigration of Monoks from the ancestral nest of Monok. Lord Ferencz Mónoki participated in the Rákóczi's War for Independence, leading to the loss of privileges and status as a petty noble, becoming a serf, whereafter his descendants would live in Slovenian country as hereditary serfs. Whereafter, this led to the shifting of the name spelling as well as the formal creation of the House of Mónek, thus a surviving line of the Monok dynasty lived in Zala County and later in Vas County.

House of Mónek 

On 14 March 1766, Stephen Mónok died upon emigration across the Kingdom of Hungary to Zala County, whereupon his son, George Mónek (1738–1783), took over as head of the family. The House of Mónek, directly descendent from the Franciscan line of the Monok dynasty, is the most senior paternal line of the Monok dynasty existent. George Mónek married Maria Vari, a Hungarian noblewoman, in the Mid-18th Century and later had issue, Joseph Mónek (1775–1873), this being the formal creation of the House of Mónek. Joseph Mónek, son of George Mónek, was born circa 1775 in Szentgotthárd, and married Anna Gáál, of the House of Gáál, born of Lord Nicholas Gáál and Maria Kóczán. Joseph Mónek was the longest living member of the Monok dynasty recorded, still holding this record within the House of Mónek, later dying in the town of his birth in 1873.

Joseph Mónek and Anna Gáál had a son, named Paul Mónek (1841-1902/1903), who would live through the Compromise of 1867, solidifying Austria and Hungary as two equal states in a Dual monarchy. Paul Mónek would marry Eva Dancsecs, of the House of Dancsecs, whose parents were Lord Imre of the House of Dancsecs and Elizabeth of the House of Kóczán.

Gyula Mónek immigrated to the United States of America following the death of his parents, Eva in 1902 and Paul in 1902/1903. As head of the house, Gyula immigrated to the United States of America on 25 February 1903, from the Belgian port of Antwerp, arriving at the New York City Harbor. Due to a misspelling of Mónek by United States immigration officials, the name Mónek would become consistently misspelt hereafter in legal documents within the United States of America, the Hungarian name Mónek became anglicized as Monek.

Military Tradition 
From the beginning, the Monok dynasty was a martial and militaristic family, seen from the story of the family's own motto "With Loyalty and Valor." Which was derived from a jousting tournament held after the coronation of King Stephen I of Hungary, this motto would set the tone for the guiding principles of the family. The Monok dynasty, historically, presents a trend of themselves fighting for the royal government of Hungary and the Hungarian Crown with loyalty.

Ladislaus Monoky (d. 1310 and 1333), son of Elijah, had a paternal great-grandson by the name of István, a guard cannoneer in Fehérvár.

John III (d. 1598) was Captain of the castle of Fülek in 1593. John III's son, Nicholas II, was made the Captain of the castle of Ónód in 1607.

Francis II lead a force of Kurucs to capture Lőcsé from Captain Grumbach, who had command of two companies to defend the village. However, a group of armed citizens, fearing the collateral danger to the city, took the keys to the camp and forced the guard to surrender the place on November 16, 1703.

List of Monoky rulers 
The Monoks' noble positions included:

 Duke (2023-Present, as claimants*)
 Count (ca. 1321)
 Vicispán of Sáros (ca. 1346-1383)
 Baron (as barons from 1625-1644; as freiherrs and as barons from 2023-Present)
 Lord (1247-1947; 2023-Present)

Progenitors and Ancestors of the Monoks 
The Monokian branch of the Bogátian line originally just owned Lazony, Lúcz, and Berettő in Hungary but eventually immigrated to Monok after obtaining ownership of the village. The Bogát-Radvány received their titles and possessions through royal donation, according to Simon of Kéza.

 Tétény (ca. 850), father of below, Chieftain of the Keszi Tribe.
 Bogát (Gyula I) (fl. 920–922), father of below, Gyula of the Hungarians, Prince of the Keszi Tribe.
 Zombor (Gyula II) (fl. 950–952), father of below, granted Patrikios in Constantinople.
 Prokui? (Gyula III) (circa 980–1003/1004), father of below.
 Buja (?-1045), father of below.
 Bogát II (Bogát II) (?-?), father of below.
 Radvány (fl. 1067—died after 1071), father of below, Palatine of Hungary from 1067 to 1071, Count-Palatine.
 N.N. Bogát-Radvány (?-?), father of below.
 N.N. Bogát-Radvány (?-?), father of below.
 Ajka Bogát-Radvány (fl. 1160), father of below, knight.
 Bogát Bogát-Radvány (Bogát III) (fl. 1190), father of below.
 Gyapol Bogát-Radvány (fl. 1227), father of below.
 Pousa Bogát-Radvány (?-1278), father of below, first predecessor to Monok dynasty.
 Beke Bogát-Radvány (?-?), father of Elijah Monoky, second predecessor to the Monok dynasty.

Before the Collapse of the Monoky main line 
Elijah Monoky became the first documented member of the family to use the name Monok in their name, thus being the founder of the Monaky/Monoky/Monoki family, circa 1250s. The House of Monoky de Monok, alternatively spelled Monaky de Monok, is a name for the Monok dynasty after the family had acquired more lands which began being documented as such as early as John Monoky II (1373–1400).

In 1644, Baron Nicholas II died, it is known that the main line died but there were other branches which had survived.

Monok 
 Elijah (Illés) (1217-c. 1290), father of below, Founder of the Monoky Dynasty, Lord over Monok.
 Count Ladislaus I (László I) (1282-Aft. 1321), father of Simon and Michael I, first extensively recorded Monok, Count (Ispán?), Lord over Monok.
 John I (János I) (fl. 1349-1383), son of Count Ladislaus, Lord over Monok.
 Simon (fl. 1346-1373), father of below, Lord over Monok, granted Lordship over Bekecs, granted Lordship over Szada.
 John II (János II) (1373–1400), father of below, Lord over Monok, granted Lordship over Megyaszó.
 Michael II (Mihály II) (?-?), father of below, Lord over Monok.
 Nicholas I (Miklós I) (circa 1450-?), father of below, Lord over Monok.
 Michael III (Mihály III) (1475-?), father of below, Lord over Monok, granted Lordship over Lúcz.
 Francis I (Ferencz I) (1505–1549), father of John III and Peter (1543-ca. 1602), Lord over Monok.
 John III (János III) (1535–1598), father of below, Lord over Monok, rebuilt the Monok Castle.
 Nicholas II (Miklós II) (fl. 1607-1643), son of above, granted Baronship, Captain of Ónod, Baron with a Red Seal, Lord.
 Peter (Péter) (1543-ca. 1602), married to Margit Szokoly, father of below, Lord.
 Nicholas (Miklós) (ca. 1575), father of below, Lord.
 John (János) (ca. 1600), father of Stephen Mónoki (fl. 1670, d. 1694), Lord.

Dobi 
 Peter Doby (Péter) (fl. 1405), father of below, Lord.
 George Doby (György) (fl. 1410), married to Ilona Drugeth, father of below, Lord.
 Ladislaus Doby (László) (fl. 1461), son of above, Lord.
 Hedvig Doby (fl. 1430), married to Simon Rozgonyi II.

Monoks after the extinction of the main line 

 Stephen Mónoki (István) (fl. 1670, d. 1694), father of below, Lord.
 Francis Mónoki (Ferencz II) (b. 1665, fl. 1694-1703), father of below, Commander in Rákóczy's War of Independence, Lord.
 Stephen Mónok (István) (1706–1766), father of George Mónek, Serf.

Mónek 
 George Mónek (György) (1738–1783), married to Maria Vari, father of below, Serf.
 Joseph Mónek (József) (1775–1873), married to Anna Gál, father of below, Serf.
 Paul Mónek (Pál) (1841–1905), married to Eva Dancsecs, father of below, Serf.
 Julius Mónek (Gyula) (1893–1978), married to Elizabeth Szepesi, son of above, Serf.

Post-Monarchical Monoks 
Titles of nobility were revoked for Hungarian citizens through Statute IV of 1947 Regarding the Abolition of Certain Titles and Ranks (Hungarian: 1947. évi IV. törvény egyes címek és rangok megszüntetéséről), nobility which resided inside the state of Hungary would have their titles abolished.

However, effective the 1st of January, 2023, the Parliament of Hungary brought back the official and legal usage of titles such as Ispán, a piece of legislation which is contrary to the Statute IV of 1947. In addition, Jesse Monek is registered as a Baron of Monek, a Baron of the Holy Roman Empire, according to the Holy Roman Empire Association, the same organisation also recognises his claim to Hungarian nobility.

Main Mónek line 

 Julius (Gyula) (1893–1978), married to Elizabeth Szepesi, great-grandfather of below, Serf.
 Jesse (Jessze), great-grandson of above, claimant to Duchy of Jülich, Baron von Monek.

See also 
 Báró (in Hungarian)
 Hungarian nobility
 List of titled noble families in the Kingdom of Hungary
 Tripartitum

References

Sources 

"Abaúj, Zemplén, Borsod, Gömör, Torna megyei molnár céhek | Libri Regii | Hungaricana". archives.hungaricana.hu, Arcanum, National Archives of Hungary (in Hungarian).

"Anjoukori okmánytár. Codex diplomaticus Hungaricus Andegavensis. I. (1301–1321) (Budapest, 1878.) | Könyvtár | Hungaricana". library.hungaricana.hu (in Hungarian).

"Barangolás Monokon." Royalmagazin.hu, https://web.archive.org/web/20160815151136/http://www.royalmagazin.hu/kozelet/barangolo/567-barangolas-monokon.

"B-A-Z megye kastélyai." users.atw.hu, http://users.atw.hu/kastelyok/b-a-z.htm.

Cartledge, Bryan (2011). The Will to Survive: A History of Hungary. C. Hurst & Co. ISBN 978-1-84904-112-6. page 352.

"Codex diplomaticus Hungariae ecclesiasticus ac civilis. Tomi IX. Vol. 3. (Budae, 1834.) | Library | Hungaricana". library.hungaricana.hu, https://library.hungaricana.hu/en/view/KozMagyOkmanytarak_Codex_Diplomaticus_Tom_9_vol_3/?pg=631&layout=s.

"Doby család." Arcanum, National Archives of Hungary, https://www.arcanum.com/en/online-kiadvanyok/Nagyivan-nagy-ivan-magyarorszag-csaladai-1/harmadik-kotet-1435/doby-csalad-203D/.

Grumeza, Ion. "The Roots of Balkanization: Eastern Europe C.E. 500–1500." University Press of America, https://books.google.com/books?id=QKhuxLdnYhMC&pg=PA87.

"Hungary, Church Books, 1624–1950", database, FamilySearch (https://www.familysearch.org/ark:/61903/1:1:6N3M-9W2R : 8 December 2022), Stephanus Monok, 1766.

Karácsonyi, János. (1901) "A magyar nemzetségek a XIV. század közepéig." A Pechujfalusi Pechy Csalad Honlapja, pechy-de-pechujfalu.hu, https://www.pechy-de-pechujfalu.hu/myfiles/htmls/karacsonyi/karaxw-Title.html.

Kezai, Simon, et al. (1999) "Gesta Hunnorum Et Hungarorum." Central European University Press.

King Andrew II of Hungary. (1999) "De bulla aurea Andreae II regis Hungariae." 1222. Valdonega, 1999.

"Királyi Könyvek – Serial Number 18.435." Hungaricana, Libri Regii Hungaricana, https://archives.hungaricana.hu/en/libriregii/hu_mnl_ol_a057_18_0435/?list=eyJxdWVyeSI6ICJNb25vayJ9.

Makkai, László (2001). "History of Transylvania Volume I. From the Beginnings to 1606 – III. Transylvania in the Medieval Hungarian Kingdom (896–1526) – 1. Transylvania'a Indigenous Population at the Time of the Hungarian Conquest." New York: Columbia University Press, (The Hungarian original by Institute of History Of The Hungarian Academy of Sciences). ISBN 0-88033-479-7.

"Monaky Castles." Kastelyok-Utazas.hu, https://web.archive.org/web/20160427000141/http://www.kastelyok-utazas.hu/Lap.php?cId=1260&kId=1260.

"Monaky-kastély ." Monok.hu, http://www.monok.hu/index.php/latnivalok/36-monaky-kastely.

"Monaky de Monak Miklós | Libri Regii | Hungaricana". archives.hungaricana.hu, Arcanum, National Archives of Hungary (in Hungarian). https://archives.hungaricana.hu/en/libriregii/hu_mnl_ol_a057_07_0321/?list=eyJxdWVyeSI6ICJNb25ha3kifQ.

"Monoky Család. (Monoki. †)." Arcanum, National Archives of Hungary, https://www.arcanum.com/hu/online-kiadvanyok/Nagyivan-nagy-ivan-magyarorszag-csaladai-1/hetedik-kotet-5828/monoky-csalad-monoki-6B2C/.

"Monoky de Monok family." Genealogy.eu, http://genealogy.euweb.cz/hung/monoky.html.

"Mónoky v. Mónok." Arcanum, National Archives of Hungary, https://www.arcanum.com/hu/online-kiadvanyok/Siebmacher-siebmacher-wappenbuch-1/der-adel-von-ungarn-magyarorszag-2/csaladok-29/monoky-v-monok-5387/.

"New York Passenger Arrival Lists (Ellis Island), 1892-1924", database with images, FamilySearch (https://familysearch.org/ark:/61903/1:1:JFTG-7MJ : 2 March 2021), Gyula Monek, 1903.

Pál Engel, et al. (2001). "The Realm of St Stephen: A History of Medieval Hungary, 895–1526." I.B. Tauris, London.

Ráth, Mór. Magyar Elektronikus Könyvtár (MEK) / Hungarian Electronic Library, Nagy Iván, https://mek.oszk.hu/09300/09379/pdf/mo_csaladai_07.pdf.

Szalay, László. "Magyarország története VI. kötet." Lipcse–Pest, 1859. PDF (In Hungarian).

"Tortenelem." Monok.hu, Web.archive.org, https://web.archive.org/web/20080311215152/http://www.monok.hu/tortenelem.html.

Hungarian nobility
Bogátradvány (genus)
Hungarian noble families